The women's 1000 metres race of the 2015–16 ISU Speed Skating World Cup 4, arranged in the Thialf arena in Heerenveen, Netherlands, was held on 12 December 2015.

Brittany Bowe of the United States won the race, while compatriot Heather Richardson-Bergsma came second, and Marrit Leenstra of the Netherlands came third. Kaylin Irvine of Canada won the Division B race.

Results
The race took place on Saturday, 12 December, with Division B scheduled in the morning session, at 10:00, and Division A scheduled in the afternoon session, at 14:00.

Division A

Division B

References

Women 1000
4